SuperBot Entertainment (formerly known as Broodworks) was an American independent video game company formed in 2009 by Shannon Studstill and Chan Park, who both worked for Santa Monica Studio. The studio, based in Culver City, California, released their fighting game PlayStation All-Stars Battle Royale on November 20, 2012 in North America, November 21, 2012 in Europe, November 22, 2012 in Australia, November 23, 2012 in the UK and January 31, 2013 in Japan. The company, having gone dark since 2014, is considered defunct.

Company overview
The company was formed in 2009 by Sony Computer Entertainment. In early 2011, it was announced that the studio was working on an unannounced "combat heavy" multiplayer title for the PlayStation 3. In April 2012, it was revealed that the game would be titled PlayStation All-Stars Battle Royale, which released in November 2012 in most parts of the world. After the release of PlayStation All-Stars Battle Royale, in February 2013, Sony Computer Entertainment cut ties with the company due to inadequate sales. SuperBot Entertainment moved on to mobile development, releasing Cuddlefish Friends in 2013. SuperBot's website went offline in 2014 and their social media went dark after a February 5, 2014 post saying they were hard at work on a Cuddlefish Friends sequel, which was not released.

Games

References

Defunct video game companies of the United States
Video game development companies
Video game companies based in California
Companies based in Culver City, California
Defunct companies based in Greater Los Angeles
Video game companies established in 2009
Video game companies disestablished in 2014
2009 establishments in California
2014 disestablishments in California